Arzawa was a region and a political entity (a "kingdom" or a federation of local powers) in Western Anatolia in the second half of the 2nd millennium BC (roughly from the late 15th century BC until the beginning of the 12th century BC). The core of Arzawa is believed to be along the Kaystros River (now known as Küçük Menderes River), with its capital at Apasa, later known as Ephesus. When the Hittites conquered Arzawa, it was divided into three Hittite provinces: a southern province called Mira along the Maeander River, which would later become known as Caria; a northern province called the Seha River Land, along the Gediz River, which would later become known as Lydia; and an eastern province called Hapalla.

It succeeded the Assuwa league, which also included parts of western Anatolia, but was conquered by the Hittites c. 1400 BC. Arzawa was the western neighbour and rival of the Middle and New Hittite Kingdoms.  On the other hand, it was in close contact with the Ahhiyawa of the Hittite texts, which corresponds to the Achaeans of Mycenaean Greece. Moreover, Achaeans and Arzawa formed a coalition against the Hittites in various periods.

Kingdom of Arzawa

According to Hittite sources, the capital of the Kingdom of Arzawa was Apasa (or Abasa), corresponding with later Greek Ephesus.

The languages spoken in Arzawa during the Bronze Age and early Iron Age cannot be directly determined due to the paucity of indigenous written sources. It was previously believed that the linguistic identity of Arzawa was predominantly Luwian, based, inter alia, on the replacement of the designation Luwiya with Arzawa in a corrupt passage of a New Hittite copy of the Laws. However, it was recently argued that Luwiya and Arzawa were two separate entities, because Luwiya is mentioned in the Hittite Laws as a part of the Hittite Old Kingdom, whereas Arzawa was independent from the Hittites during this period. The geographic identity between Luwiya and Arzawa was rejected or doubted in a variety of recent publications, although the ethnolinguistic implications of this analysis remain to be assessed. One scholar suggested that there was no significant Luwian population in Arzawa, but instead that it was predominantly inhabited by speakers of Proto-Lydian and Proto-Carian. The difference between the two approaches need not be exaggerated since the Carian language belongs to the Luwic branch of the Anatolian languages. Thus, the Luwic presence in Arzawa is universally acknowledged, but whether the elites of Arzawa were Luwian in the narrow sense remains a matter of debate.

The zenith of the kingdom was during the 15th and 14th centuries BC. The Hittites were then weakened, and Arzawa was an ally of Egypt.

Arzawa letters 
Alliance with Egypt is recorded in the correspondence between the Arzawan ruler Tarhundaradu and the Pharaoh Amenophis III, which is part of the Amarna letters archive found in Egypt. Two of these letters (Nr. 31 and 32) are known as the Arzawa letters, and they played a substantial role in the decipherment of the Hittite language in which they were written.

Jorgen A. Knudtzon, a Norwegian linguist and historian, played a big role in this decipherment. In 1902, he recognized the Hittite language as Indo-European based on their study. He published further two volumes on Amarna letters in 1907 and 1915.

Max Gander (2014) analysed the clay from which the Amarna Letter EA 32 tablet was made based on the petrographical analyses that had been conducted. Three different analytical methods were used in these analyses.

According to him, the results are rather surprising. What would be expected from them, based on general opinion, is that the clay should have come somewhere from the vicinity of Ephesos, which is widely considered as core territory of the Arzawan state. But instead, they point to northern Ionia, and even into Aeolis. Specifically mentioned are the areas around the cities of Kyme (Aeolis) and/or Larissa. But this location is very close to, or even inside of the conventional location of the Seha River Land.

Accordingly, Gander suggests that Seha should be located further to the south. Thus it could be located south of Ephesus, and closer to the valley of Meander River. Such a location was generally considered in older scholarship.

As to Arzawa, Gander suggests that it could have been located closer to what was later called Lydia.

Relations with the Hittite kingdom 
According to Hittite records, in c. 1320 BC Arzawa joined an anti-Hittite alliance together with the region of  Millawanta (Miletus) under the king of the Ahhiyawa (the latter widely accepted as Mycenaean Greece or part of it). As a response to this initiative, the Hittite kings Suppiluliuma I and Mursili II finally managed to defeat Arzawa around 1300 BC. The king of Arzawa managed to escape to Mycenaean-controlled territory. Arzawa was then split by the Hittites into vassal kingdoms. These were called:

 Kingdom of Mira,
 Hapalla (transcriptions vary),
 "Seha river land".

"Seha river" is now believed to be the present-day Gediz River, although some scholars said it was the Bakırçay river.

Also, Mursili's son Muwatalli added Wilusa (Troy) as a vassal.

In 1998, J. David Hawkins succeeded in reading the Karabel relief inscription, located at the Karabel pass, about 20 km from Izmir. This has provided evidence that the kingdom of Mira was actually south of the 'Seha river land', thus locating the latter along the Gediz River.

These kingdoms, usually termed simply as "lands" in Hittite registers, could have formed part of the Arzawa complex already during the existence of the Arzawa kingdom.

Known western Anatolian late-Bronze Age regions and/or political entities which, to date, have not been cited as having been part of the Arzawa complex are:

 Land of Masa/Masha (associable with Iron Age "Mysia")
 Karkisa/Karkiya (associable with Iron Age "Caria")
 Lukka lands (associable with Iron Age "Lycia")

After the collapse of the Hittite Empire from the 12th century, while Neo-Hittite states partially pursued Hittite history in southern Anatolia and Syria, the chain seems to have broken as far as the Arzawa lands in western Anatolia were concerned and these could have pursued their own cultural path until unification came with the emergence of Lydia as a state under the Mermnad dynasty in the 7th century BC.

There has been evidence from a British expedition in 1954 to Beycesultan in inner western Anatolia which suggests that the local king had central heating in his home. Nothing more was heard from this invention until Gaius Sergius Orata reinvented it in Ancient Rome around 80 BC.

Kings of Arzawa in the 15th to 13th century BC
Kupanta-Kurunta c.1440s BC
Madduwatta of Zippasla (conquered Arzawa, may or may not have been king of Arzawa) c.1420s BC
Tarhundaradu c.1370s BC
Anzapahhadu c. 1350s
Piyama-Kurunda c. 1343 BC
Tapalazunaulis c.1342 BC
Muwa-Malwis
Manappa-Tarhunta c.1340 BC
Ura-Tarhunta c.1330 BC
Tarksnawa c.1320s BC
Uhha-Ziti - defeated by Mursili II around 1320 BC

See also

Ancient regions of Anatolia
History of the Hittites
Assuwa
Lukka
Lydia

References

Sources

Gander, M. 2017. "The West: Philology". Hittite Landscape and Geography, M. Weeden and L. Z. Ullmann (eds.). Leiden: Brill. pp. 262–280.    
Hawkins, J. D. 1998. ‘Tarkasnawa King of Mira: Tarkendemos, Boğazköy Sealings, and Karabel.’ Anatolian Studies 48:1–31.
Hawkins, J. D. 2009. The Arzawa letters in recent perspective. British Museum Studies in Ancient Egypt and Sudan 14:73–83.
Hawkins, J. D. 2013. ‘A New Look at the Luwian Language.’ Kadmos 52/1: 1-18. 

Matessi, A. 2017. "The Making of Hittite Imperial Landscapes: Territoriality and Balance of Power in South-Central Anatolia during the Late Bronze Age". Journal of Ancient Near Eastern History, AoP. 
Melchert, H. Craig (ed) (2003). The Luwians. Leiden: Brill.
Singer, I. 2005. ‘On Luwians and Hittites.’ Bibliotheca Orientalis 62:430–51. (Review article of Melchert 2003).
Yakubovich, Ilya. (2010). Sociolinguistics of the Luwian Language. Leiden: Brill.

External links

"The Arzawa Page"
Catalog of Hittite Texts
Map of Trojan war region.

 
States and territories established in the 15th century BC
States and territories disestablished in the 12th century BC
Hittites
Lydia
Amarna letters locations
Historical regions of Anatolia
Former kingdoms